The Tribe is a short documentary film directed by Tiffany Shlain and narrated by Peter Coyote. Weaving together archival footage, graphics and animation, it tells the history of both the Barbie doll and the Jewish people from Biblical times to the present.

Awards
Best Documentary: NY Shorts Fest 2007 
Best Jewish Topics, Argentina Jewish Film Festival 2007
Best Documentary: LA Shorts Fest 2007
Grand Jury Prize Winner: Florida Film Festival 2007 
Best Short Documentary, Warsaw Jewish Film Festival 2007 
Best Contemporary Jewish Film: "Jewish Motifs" International Film Festival, 2007
Best Documentary Film: Golden Star Awards 2007
Best Short Documentary, Nashville Film Festival 2006
Directors Choice Award, Black Maria Film Festival 2006
Winner: Audience Award, Ann Arbor Film Festival 2006
Best Historical Film, SF International Women's Film Festival 2006
Indiewire's Sundance Critic's Choice 2006

Official selections
Sundance Film Festival
Tribeca Film Festival
International Film Festival Rotterdam
SilverDocs
United Nations Association
Black Maria Film Festival
Hot Springs Documentary Film Festival

Cameos

Dina Amsterdam, Bill Barnes, Marina Berlin,
Stellah DeVille, Carlton Evans, Amy Gershoni,
Ken Goldberg, Romy Itzigsohn, Misha Leybovich,
Emily Morse, Jen Naylor, Ian Schneider,
Jordan Shlain, BJ Wasserman, Adam Werbach

References

External links
 
Official homepage

eFilmCritic Movie Review

Documentary films about Jews and Judaism
Films about Barbie
2005 films
American short documentary films
2005 short documentary films
2000s American animated films
2000s English-language films